Mojinete Municipality is the second municipal section of the Sur Lípez Province in the Potosí Department in Bolivia. Its seat is Mojinete.

Subdivision 
The municipality consists of the following cantons: 
 Bonete Palca 
 Casa Grande
 Mojinete 
 Pueblo Viejo
 La Cienega

The people 
The people are predominantly indigenous citizens of Quechua descent.

References

External links 
Mojinete Municipality: population data and map

Municipalities of Potosí Department